Dhenkanal is a town in Odisha, India.

Dhenkanal may also refer to:
 Dhenkanal district, Odisha, India
 Dhenkanal (Odisha Vidhan Sabha constituency)
 Dhenkanal (Lok Sabha constituency) 
 Dhenkanal State, a princely state during the British Raj
 Dhenkanal College, a college in Dhenkanal district
 Dhenkanal railway station